Micropaschia is a monotypic snout moth genus. Its only species, Micropaschia orthogrammalis, was described by George Hampson in 1906. It is found in French Guiana.

References

Moths described in 1906
Epipaschiinae
Monotypic moth genera
Moths of South America
Pyralidae genera